Kavasila may refer to the following places in Greece:

Kavasila, Attica, a village in the Athens metropolitan area (Attica)
Kavasila, Elis, a village in Elis
Kavasila, Imathia, a village in Imathia
Kavasila, Ioannina, a village in northern Ioannina regional unit